The Kingdom Hearts video game series, developed by Square Enix in collaboration with Disney, is set in a universe consisting of numerous self-contained worlds based on intellectual properties from both companies. Most worlds are based on different Disney films, although several original worlds appear throughout the series.

The series centers on the character Sora, a boy who searches for his lost friends and encounters Disney and Square Enix characters as he travels between worlds. In the first game, Kingdom Hearts, Sora fights against the villains of the series known as the Heartless and seals each world he visits to prevent their return. In Kingdom Hearts II, Sora helps the residents of these worlds again while searching for his friend Riku. The Kingdom Hearts games have been both critically acclaimed and commercially successful, and the design of the worlds has been praised for its faithfulness to the source material.

Concept and design
Nomura intended hearts and the strengths and connections of the heart, to be a common theme in the games. Characters within the Kingdom Hearts series are composed of three parts: body, soul, and heart. The body acts as a vessel for the heart and soul, with the soul giving life to the body. The heart holds their memories and gives them emotion, light, and darkness.

The Kingdom Hearts games are divided into various game levels, referred to as "worlds", which the player progresses through throughout each game. Worlds vary in appearance, typically dependent on the Disney setting which they are based on. The worlds' graphics resemble the art style from the originating Disney film, and the worlds are inhabited by characters from their respective films; for example, Hercules and Philoctetes appear in Olympus Coliseum from Hercules, while Aladdin, Princess Jasmine, and the Genie appear in Agrabah from Aladdin. The game worlds consist of interconnected field maps where battles and plot-related events occur. Players travel between worlds in different ways each game, such as the "Gummi Ship" in the original Kingdom Hearts, "Keyblade glider" in Kingdom Hearts Birth by Sleep, "Corridors of Darkness" in 358/2 Days, and "Sleeping Keyholes" in Dream Drop Distance. Worlds created specifically for the series mirror the overall appearance of the other worlds and predominantly feature characters from Square Enix games and original characters.

Though Disney gave director Tetsuya Nomura freedom to choose which characters and worlds would be used in the games, he and his staff tried to stay within the established roles of characters and boundaries of the worlds. Nomura found managing and keeping consistent multiple worlds to be problematic. After determining the number of worlds in the universe, Nomura picked ones he felt would fit into the series' scenario. The list was then evaluated by his team and finally by Disney representatives. Nomura tried to maintain the same number of worlds in each game and made an effort to minimize any overlap in the overall look and feel of each world. He and his staff accomplished this by categorizing various Disney worlds by appearance and setting. For example, a world based on The Jungle Book was considered for the first game but was omitted due to its similarity to Deep Jungle from Tarzan. They also tried to take into account worlds with Disney characters that would be interesting. For example, Nomura chose to include a Mulan world for its unique atmosphere. The Tron world's design was meant to emulate an old computer game in the style of the 1982 film. Nomura got the idea to include this world after seeing a Disney employee working on  Tron 2.0. He hoped that the fact that it was so different from the other worlds would make it enjoyable to players.

Creatures/Enemies

Heartless
The  are creatures born from the darkness of people's hearts, lacking a body or soul, serving as the most common type of enemy the player encounters in the Kingdom Hearts series. Their name derives from their lack of a heart, despite originating from people's hearts. When darkness consumes a character's heart, they become corrupted and transform into Heartless. The Heartless act as forces of darkness, seeking to consume more hearts, including those of worlds.

Initially, the Heartless exist within an all-encompassing variety, the "Pureblood". Before the events of the first Kingdom Hearts, these Purebloods are typically only encountered in the realm of darkness, although people with a strong will may summon them to the realm of light. While studying the Pureblood Heartless, as a side effect of their research to control the mind through the heart, Xehanort and Ansem's other apprentices devise the means to create artificial "Emblem" Heartless via the corruption of living hearts, which are differentiated from Purebloods by an insignia on their bodies. Unlike Purebloods, Emblem Heartless release hearts once defeated. However, unless the Keyblade is used to defeat the Heartless, the stolen hearts go to the realm of darkness, where they turn into Heartless again. This, combined with Maleficent's quest to gather the seven Princesses of Heart by using the forces of darkness, make the Heartless a common sight within the realm of light by the events of the first Kingdom Hearts.

Ordinarily, the Heartless are mindless and function on instinct but obey those with a strong will. However, in worlds closer to darkness, the Heartless are more powerful and become uncontrollable. They invade worlds through corridors of darkness, which are unpredictable pathways that interlink the many worlds.

Nobody
When Heartless are created, the body and soul of those with strong hearts that have lost their hearts to darkness become another type of creature called . As they lack hearts possessing light and darkness, they are "nothing", yet still exist within the Kingdom Hearts universe. Despite this, Nobodies have the potential to gain new hearts of their own through time, separate from their original selves. Nobodies typically assume malformed, inhuman shapes; however, the members of Organization XIII, a group of Nobodies central to the plot of the series, keep their human forms because they possessed strong hearts as humans and thus remember who they were. Most members of the Organization control one type of Nobody suited to their fighting style, each corresponding to a job in Final Fantasy.

Like the Emblem Heartless, the Nobodies have an insignia—an upside-down, incomplete heart—which was designed to look like a splintered heart as a complement to the Heartless emblem. Upon being defeated, a Nobody fades into a state of non-existence until its Heartless counterpart is destroyed with the captive heart released, recreating the original being that they were.

Within the series, two Nobodies, Roxas and Naminé are considered "special cases" regarding the circumstances of their births. Both are created when Sora uses Xehanort's Keyblade of heart to release his and Kairi's hearts, respectively, but because of many peculiar events, manage to exist alongside their original selves, rather than in lieu of them. Unlike Organization XIII's other members, who resemble their original selves with their memories and personalities intact, Roxas resembles Ventus rather than Sora due to holding the former's heart within himself, and has none of Sora's memories due to the short duration of Sora's Heartless state. Meanwhile, Naminé is born of Kairi's heart through Sora's body and, in addition to not having Kairi's memories, has the ability to alter the memories of Sora and those close to him.

Unversed
The  are creatures that are introduced and predominantly appear in Kingdom Hearts Birth by Sleep. Described by Nomura as being "those who are not well-versed in their own existences", they are Vanitas' emotions given form and feed on the negativity of others, which allows them to assume more powerful forms. Vanitas pits these creatures against his counterpart, Ventus, as a means of strengthening him as part of Master Xehanort's plan to obtain the χ-blade. Upon defeat, the Unversed's negativity reintegrates with Vanitas, allowing him to recreate them no matter how many times they are destroyed. The Unversed cease to be after Vanitas integrates back into Ventus and is subsequently destroyed within Ventus's subconscious, but are temporarily restored following his return during the events of Kingdom Hearts III.

Bug Blox
To investigate a message hidden in Jiminy Cricket's journal left by Naminé, King Mickey has the book digitized to uncover the mystery; however, due to the "hurt" the message contains, most of the data ended up corrupted, resulting in the data worlds being infected with bugs. They primarily take the form of cubes that the game's main protagonist, a virtual replica of Sora called "Data-Sora", can destroy or use as platforms. There are several different varieties of Bug Blox, the most common, breakable variety being black-and-red in color. Other bugs take the appearance of boss-level Heartless that Sora had defeated in Kingdom Hearts. Villains and boss-level Heartless make use of the bugs to assist them in fighting Data-Sora.

It is later learned that the recording of Sora's Heartless had gained sentience and is responsible for the journal being blank even after the restoration of Sora's memories, due to how the book revolved around Sora; it seeks to devour the rest of the digital Heartless for power and escape into the real world to sate its hunger for hearts. While its most basic form is the weak and common "Shadow" variety of Heartless, it grows increasingly powerful to the point where it takes other forms, such as an entirely black lookalike of Sora with yellow eyes or an enormous variety of Heartless called "Darkside". The bugs cease to be after Data-Sora destroys the original bug and resets the entire datascape.

Dream Eater

 are primarily featured in Kingdom Hearts 3D: Dream Drop Distance. Like the Heartless, they are beings of darkness that inhabit the Sleeping worlds isolated from the realm of light and are compelled to find the worlds' keyholes. Dream Eaters manifest in two kinds: hostile "Nightmares", which devour good dreams and create bad ones, serving as the game's enemies; and benevolent "Spirits", which the player can create to serve as party members and combat the Nightmares. Several boss enemy Nightmares appear under the control of Young Xehanort and various Disney villains throughout the game. Riku temporarily turns into a Dream Eater by subconsciously entering Sora's dreams upon sensing Xehanort's interference within the Mark of Mastery exam.

Objects

Keyblade

 are key-shaped melee weapons created to combat darkness and are the only thing that can free hearts from a Heartless form, thus allowing the restoration of complete beings. Keyblades also have the ability to lock and unlock all manners of doors and keyholes. Initially, these Keyblades were crafted in the image of the original "χ-blade" by those who wanted the light within Kingdom Hearts for themselves and those who sought the opposite. Wielders acknowledged as "Keyblade Masters" can bequeath the power to wield a Keyblade to one they deem worthy by letting them touch the handle of the blade or connecting their heart to another. There are also Keyblades like the one Xehanort uses that are passed down from different owners through generations.

Keyblades change in both appearance and strength with different keychains, which augment its wielder's fighting capabilities; some are obtained as a result of in-game events, while others can be obtained by completing mini-games. A driving element to the first game is the ability to seal the "heart" of a world by locking the keyhole to the door leading to it, preventing it from being destroyed by Heartless. In Kingdom Hearts II, the player uses the Keyblade to unlock pathways between worlds that were closed after the events of the first game. While Sora is the only one who uses the Keyblade in the first game, later games reveal more characters who wield Keyblades. In Birth by Sleep, Keyblades can be transformed into hovercraft called Keyblade Gliders, which can be used to travel from world to world, making Keyblade wielders the only people with the means of transportation between worlds before Gummi Ships are used. The "gates" Sora would open later are known as the Lanes Between, which can be accessed by any Keyblade wielder.

χ-blade
The  is an ancient weapon of unknown origin introduced in Birth by Sleep that is capable of directly unlocking Kingdom Hearts. It is a double-handed weapon that takes the shape of two "Kingdom Key" Keyblades that intersect in an "X" shape, with additional features that give it the shape of an actual sword. The weapon has the power to open the heart of all worlds, and it exists alongside Kingdom Hearts as its guardian. It led to "Keyblades" being crafted in its image by those seeking Kingdom Hearts' power, those who sought to extinguish the light, and those who sought to protect it. The result was the Keyblade War, which ended in a world known as the Keyblade Graveyard; the aftermath led the χ-blade itself to shatter into seven pieces of light and thirteen pieces of darknesses. These seven lights, which are said to be the source of all light in the World, later became the hearts of the Princesses of Heart.

In Birth by Sleep, Master Xehanort's over-eagerness to obtain the weapon has him seek to clash two hearts of equal strength—one of pure light and one of pure darkness—with each other. He finds such a means through his former apprentice Ventus and the youths' personified darkness Vanitas, whom Xehanort created and enlisted to ensure his plans succeed. Though Ventus and Vanitas fuse back into one being with the χ-blade in hand, the reunion is not complete as the unstable χ-blade eventually explodes due to Vanitas' destruction within Ventus. The events of Dream Drop Distance reveal that, as a contingency to his previous plan, Xehanort has arranged the formation of his thirteen "Seekers of Darkness", the new Organization XIII composing of his various incarnations and vessels, to fight the Keyblade users who would form seven "Guardians of Light", or target the Princesses of Heart, to recreate the χ-blade.

Kingdom Hearts

The titular  is the "heart of all worlds" and the source of hearts. It is an object of immense power and a central plot element that drives the conflict within the series as its light drove many to fight over it ages ago in what became the Keyblade War. In the end, Kingdom Hearts was consumed in the darkness caused by the conflict, and the worlds became separate from each other. Master Xehanort seeks the return of Kingdom Hearts during Birth by Sleep; while Kingdom Hearts does appear over the Keyblade Graveyard in the game, the flawed reunion of Ventus and Vanitas makes the unstable χ-blade explode, causing Kingdom Hearts to vanish. After splitting himself into a Heartless and a Nobody, Ansem (Xehanort's Heartless) seeks out the Door to Darkness to gain access to an artificial Kingdom Hearts created from the hearts of worlds, while Xemnas (Xehanort's Nobody) seeks to create his own artificial Kingdom Hearts from the hearts of people. These artificial constructs, however, are only small-scale versions of the "true" Kingdom Hearts, which can only be accessed with its counterpart, the χ-blade.

Each Kingdom Hearts takes different shapes depending on from which hearts they are created. The first game's Kingdom Hearts, artificially created from the hearts of worlds, has the appearance of a sphere of light beyond a white door. The Kingdom Hearts made by Organization XIII, on the other hand, takes the form of a yellow heart-shaped moon. The authentic Kingdom Hearts called upon by the χ-blade is depicted as a blue heart-shaped moon in Birth by Sleep and yellow in Kingdom Hearts III.

Worlds

The Kingdom Hearts universe is divided into planes of existence called "realms". Most of the series takes place in the "realm of light". Opposite the realm of light is the "realm of darkness", where Kingdom Hearts resides and where Heartless are born. The "in-between realm" is a plane where Nobodies come into existence. As well as these known realms, Ansem the Wise is banished to a "realm of nothingness", which he describes as a place "where all existence has been disintegrated".<ref>Secret Ansem Report #5: In this realm, where all existence has been disintegrated, I have just barely managed to preserve my sense of self by continuing to think and to write. </ref>

In the Kingdom Hearts universe, travel between worlds is normally not possible. Worlds are protected from extraterrestrial interference by an invisible shell. When the heart of a world is opened, the shell breaks apart, appearing as a meteor shower. Fragments from the wall are called "Gummi blocks" and are used to make spaceships called "Gummi Ships", which serve as the main mode of travel between the various worlds. Gummi Ships can be shaped into any structure, and the origin of the Gummi Ship material allows for travel to other worlds. Gummi blocks serve different functions, from navigation to offense and defense. Other methods to travel between worlds are the "corridors of darkness" and the "lanes between"—interdimensional pathways through which frequent travel eventually erodes unprotected users' hearts with darkness. Heartless and Nobodies normally use these paths, but other characters have used them, including Riku and Mickey Mouse.

Those who travel between worlds are advised to limit their interactions with the inhabitants of foreign worlds to avoid causing chaos. For this reason, the main characters change their appearance in certain worlds to avoid standing out. In the worlds based on The Little Mermaid and The Nightmare Before Christmas, Sora, Donald, and Goofy transform into undersea creatures and Halloween monsters, respectively. For The Lion King, they transform into savannah animals because Nomura felt that it would appear odd to have Sora and the others interact in their standard forms since no humans appear in that film.

Disney worlds
The majority of worlds that appear in the games are based on Disney films. Most of these worlds, such as Wonderland, the Land of Dragons, and Castle of Dreams, follow abridged versions of the stories found in their respective films. Agrabah covers the first two Aladdin films in Kingdom Hearts and Kingdom Hearts II, while Atlantica and Halloween Town only mirror their films in the second game, having an unrelated plot in the first game. On the other hand, worlds like Monstro and Neverland focus heavily on the main Kingdom Hearts plot, the latter being reduced to Captain Hook's ship, where Riku reveals to Sora that Kairi has lost her heart; these worlds would not be able to be explored in full until the later releases of Kingdom Hearts 3D: Dream Drop Distance, Kingdom Hearts 358/2 Days and Kingdom Hearts Birth By Sleep, respectively. In Beauty and the Beast, the Beast appears in Kingdom Hearts to aid Sora when he temporarily loses the Keyblade. After the restoration of Beast's Castle at the end of that game, the Beast becomes a pawn in the plot of Organization XIII during Kingdom Hearts II.

During the development of Kingdom Hearts II, Nomura had more creative freedom due to advances in technology. Port Royal/The Caribbean, Space Paranoids, and Pride Lands, in particular, benefited from these advances. In Port Royal and Space Paranoids, the character models were generated from live-action pictures using a new program. Nomura had wanted to include a world based on The Lion King in the first game but could not since its engine could not process quadrupedal character models properly, a feature included in Kingdom Hearts II.

Birth by Sleep introduced several new Disney-based worlds to the series: Castle of Dreams, Enchanted Dominion, Dwarf Woodlands and Deep Space. Dream Drop Distance included more new Disney worlds, such as La Cité des Cloches, The Grid, Prankster's Paradise, Country of the Musketeers, and Symphony of Sorcery.

Kingdom Hearts III introduces more worlds such as Kingdom of Corona, San Fransokyo, Toy Box, Monstropolis, and Arendelle. When questioned on the possibility of including worlds based on Disney-purchased properties such as Pixar, Marvel Entertainment and Lucasfilm, co-director Tai Yasue said, "We have to come up with a world that has a lot of originality. We want variety... so we don't want too many of one sort of world, that would look the same. For each world there has to be some meaning for it, in the plot... Also, gameplay-wise, is that world something that would make gameplay fun?" The game does not feature any worlds based on Final Fantasy.

In addition to the Gummi Ship mini-game, mini-games feature prominently in certain worlds. While Atlantica is an ordinary world in Kingdom Hearts, albeit with a unique "underwater" control scheme, it becomes an interactive rhythm game in Kingdom Hearts II which is entirely unrelated to the overall story and serves as a mere filler. Space Paranoids features a Light Cycle mini-game that strongly deviates from the original film. Nomura included this mini-game because he knew people associated the Light Cycles with Tron.
 Disney Town: The Homeworld of Mickey, Donald, Goofy, and Pete. Parts of it include Disney Castle and two sub-worlds that depict the world's past. The first is called the Timeless River, which is the "past" of Disney Castle, shortly before it was built. The world is portrayed in black and white; Nomura had intended it to be this way from the beginning of development. The world has many throwback effects, including intentionally poor sound quality to imitate old cartoons. In this grayscale world, Sora's character model is simplified to the style of early cartoons, while Goofy and Donald Duck revert to their original designs from when they first appeared in Disney cartoons. The second sub-world is a sleeping world known as the Country of the Musketeers.
 Mysterious Tower: The residence of Yen Sid, which includes the sub-world Symphony of Sorcery''' that depicts the tower as it appeared in the past when Mickey became Yen Sid's apprentice.
 100 Acre Wood: The residence of Winnie the Pooh and friends, accessed via a book. Its appearances consist entirely of mini-games based on classic Winnie the Pooh shorts, with Sora taking on the role of Christopher Robin.
 Olympus Coliseum: The homeworld of Hercules, which serves as a place for optional fighting tournaments. Due to Hades' popularity, the Underworld was added in Kingdom Hearts II, where Hades has opened a tournament.

Original worlds
The worlds created specifically for the series predominantly feature original and Square Enix characters and figure more centrally to the overarching plot of the Kingdom Hearts series. The first world of each game serves as a tutorial to introduce new gameplay elements and frame the story. Both they and the Disney worlds are fragments of the original world, identified in Kingdom Hearts III as Scala Ad Caelum, the seat of power for the ancient Keyblade masters and serves as the final dungeon in the game.
 Destiny Islands: The homeworld of Sora, Riku, and Xehanort.
 Traverse Town: A world cobbled together from the remains of worlds destroyed by the Heartless, serving as hub world in Kingdom Hearts and as a sleeping world in Dream Drop Distance. The main cast from The World Ends with You appears in the latter game, where the world was used to host the Reaper's Game.
 Radiant Garden: The homeworld of Ansem the Wise, his apprentices, various Final Fantasy characters, and the birthplace of Kairi. Due to the machinations of Xehanort, Ansem's study of the darkness in people's enable Terra-Xehanort to bring Radiant Garden into ruin. Throughout Kingdom Hearts and most of Kingdom Hearts II, Radiant Garden is known as Hollow Bastion and is used by Maleficent as her base during the first game before Squall and his group rebuild the world as depicted in Kingdom Hearts II.
 The End of the World: A land created from the worlds that lost their hearts to the Heartless, serving as the final world in Kingdom Hearts.
 The Realm of Darkness: This is the world of the Pureblood Heartless, where Riku and Mickey appear at the end of Kingdom Hearts and help Sora seal the door that links it to the End of the World. Sora and Riku briefly visit the realm at the end of Kingdom Hearts II, while Aqua spends years trapped in it following the events of Birth by Sleep.
 The Land of Departure: The homeworld of Eraqus and his apprentices, the world itself acting on the will of Eraqus before he passed his title to his apprentice Aqua. Following the end of Birth by Sleep, Aqua uses her power to transform the main castle of the Land of Departure into Castle Oblivion, which serves as the main setting of Chain of Memories, with its multiple floors holding memory-based reconstructions of other worlds created via unique cards. The world is later restored to its original state by Aqua in Kingdom Hearts III.
 Twilight Town: The homeworld of Hayner, Pence, and Olette where Ansem the Wise takes refuge as DiZ, serving as both a tutorial world and the penultimate world in Kingdom Hearts II. It returns as a main hub in Kingdom Hearts III.
 The World That Never Was: A world in the in-between realm that Organization XIII uses as their base of operations while working on their artificial Kingdom Hearts, serving as the final world in Kingdom Hearts II and Dream Drop Distance. This conception of Kingdom Hearts was designed to appear as the heart-shaped moon from the first Kingdom Hearts game cover. When the scenario writer, Kazushige Nojima, created the scenario, he described it as a moon floating in the World That Never Was. Upon reading this, Nomura thought of using the visuals from the first game to create a connection.
 The Keyblade Graveyard: A world depicted as the site of the final battle of the Keyblade War, and where the climax in Birth by Sleep and Kingdom Hearts III takes place.
 Scala ad Caelum: A vast city that was the seat of power for the ancient Keyblade masters and where Eraqus and Xehanort trained in their youth, as seen in Kingdom Hearts: Dark Road. It later served as the site of Sora's final battle with Xehanort in Kingdom Hearts III.
 Daybreak Town: The homeworld of the Foretellers and their Unions, serving as the hub world in Kingdom Hearts χ. It is left in ruins following the Keyblade War, and Scala ad Caelum is built upon its remains.
 Final World: A realm on the edge of reality inhabited by faded remnants of those unable to move on due to their hearts' strong attachments, Sora unknowingly appeared in the Final World during his dreams before ending up in the realm during his group's battle with Terra-Xehanort. Though Sora is able to return, he ends up back in the Final World after sacrificing himself to revive Kairi.

Reception
The series' setting has garnered mostly positive reception from critics. Following Kingdom Hearts initial announcement, publications expressed skepticism towards the first game's viability. Andrew Reiner of Game Informer stated that despite the extreme differences between Final Fantasy and Disney properties, they blend well together along with the new content created for the series. A second Game Informer reviewer, Matt Miller, described the concept as a "hard sell", describing the combination of the two properties as "ridiculous". He also stated his belief that the franchise's formula is successful. The graphics of the games have received generous praise, with particular focus on their similarity to the source material. IGN stated that the "worlds look very much like their filmed counterparts". Japanese gaming site, Gpara.com also praised the look of the worlds. GameSpot referred to the worlds as "wonderfully rich familiar environments", and GamePro described the worlds as "spot-on with the original movies."

Following the release of the first game, the Disney settings were well received by critics. Allgame's Scott Marriott stated the Disney settings are the most attractive feature of the game and considered some of the world choices a surprise. He praised the level designs, commenting that many familiar elements from the Disney films were integrated into them. Marriott further stated that though the stages were small, interacting with beloved characters and exploring familiar settings were enjoyable aspects. Maura Sutton of Computer and Video Games attributed the Disney elements as a major factor in creating the game's "astounding worlds". She summarized her review by calling Kingdom Hearts a "delightful mixture of two enchanted worlds". Video game critics of Kingdom Hearts: Chain of Memories expressed disappointment at the limited number of new worlds to explore in the game. 1UP.com's Bryan Intihar lauded Kingdom Hearts IIs environment, calling it appealing and stating it was an improvement over the first title's. He described the level designs as "impeccable", citing the presentation of the Timeless River stage's atmosphere. Intihar further commented that the expansions and changes to previous worlds made them "feel fresh". In contrast, Reiner described the Disney elements in Kingdom Hearts II'' as "tacked on".

References

External links
 Kingdom Hearts Japan official portal
 Kingdom Hearts North America official portal

Kingdom Hearts
Video game locations
Kingdom Hearts
Kingdom_Hearts Universe